Tony Jensen (born 27 March 1980 in Australia) is a former professional rugby league footballer.

Jensen grew up in Toowoomba where he attended Harristown State High School and played for the Newtown Lions in the Toowoomba Rugby League.

References

1980 births
Living people
Australian rugby league players
Manly Warringah Sea Eagles players
Northern Eagles players
Rugby league players from Toowoomba
Rugby league second-rows
St. George Illawarra Dragons players
Place of birth missing (living people)